Matthias Bleyer (born December 10, 1978 in Karl-Marx-Stadt, Saxony) is a former German pair skater who competed with Nicole Nönnig. They teamed up in 2001. The pair was coached by Ingo Steuer in Chemnitz. In 2003, they won the silver medal at the German Figure Skating Championships and placed 8th at the European Figure Skating Championships.

Programs 
(with Nönnig)

Results 
(with Nönnig)

References 

 
 Interview by the Paarlauf-Fanclub

1978 births
Living people
German male pair skaters
Sportspeople from Chemnitz